Darkar Gewog (Dzongkha: དར་དཀར་), formerly known as Daga, is a gewog (village block) of Wangdue Phodrang District, Bhutan.

References 

Gewogs of Bhutan
Wangdue Phodrang District